Magne Sturød (born 19 October 1979) is a Norwegian professional football midfielder.

He started his career at Ulefoss and Skarphedin, before joining the larger club Sandefjord. After the 2005 season he went to Denmark and OB. He left OB after only a year for the rival club Horsens. Ahead of the 2009 season he returned to Norway and Kongsvinger.

Sturød joined Notodden ahead of the 2011 season, and played 14 matches and scored two goals for the club until 30 June 2011, when he left the club.

References

External links
AC Horsens profile
Career statistics at Danmarks Radio

1979 births
Living people
Norwegian footballers
Sandefjord Fotball players
Odense Boldklub players
AC Horsens players
Kongsvinger IL Toppfotball players
Notodden FK players
Norwegian First Division players
Danish Superliga players
Eliteserien players
Norwegian expatriate footballers
Expatriate men's footballers in Denmark
Association football midfielders
People from Ulefoss
Sportspeople from Vestfold og Telemark